The Ministry of Home Affairs of India has banned a number of organizations that have been proscribed as terrorist organizations under the Unlawful Activities (Prevention) Act.

The list
 the banned groups are:

 Al-Qaeda / al-Qaeda in the Indian Subcontinent and all its manifestations
 Al-Umar-Mujahideen
 Al-Badr
 All Tripura Tiger Force
 Akhil Bharat Nepali Ekta Samaj
 Communist Party of India (Maoist), all its formations and front organizations
 Communist Party of India (Marxist–Leninist) People's War, all its formations and front organizations
 Deendar Anjuman
 Dukhtaran-e-Millat
 Garo National Liberation Army, all its formations and front organizations
 Hizbul Mujahideen / Hizbul Mujahideen Pir Panjal Regiment
 Harkat-ul-Mujahideen / Harkat ul-Ansar / 	Jamiat ul-Ansar
 Indian Mujahideen, all its formations and front organizations
 Islamic State of Iraq and the Levant / Islamic State of Iraq and the Levant – Khorasan Province and all its manifestations
 International Sikh Youth Federation
 Jaish-e-Mohammed/Tahrik-e-Furqan
 Jamaat-ul-Mujahideen Bangladesh, all its formations and front organizations
 Jammu and Kashmir Islamic Front
 Jamaat-ul-Mujahideen
 Kamtapur Liberation Organisation, all its formations and front organizations
 Khalistan Liberation Force and all its manifestations
 Khalistan Commando Force
 Khalistan Zindabad Force
 Kangleipak Communist Party
 Kanglei Yawol Kanna Lup
 Lashkar-e-Taiba / Pasban-e-Ahle Hadis
 Liberation Tigers of Tamil Eelam
 Maoist Communist Centre of India, all its formations and front organizations
 Manipur People’s Liberation Front
 National Socialist Council of Nagaland (Khaplang), all its formations and front organizations
 National Democratic Front of Boroland
 National Liberation Front of Tripura
 National Socialist Council of Nagaland
 Organisations listed in the Schedule to the U.N. Prevention and Suppression of Terrorism (Implementation of Security Council Resolutions) Order, 2007 made under section 2 of the United Nations (Security Council) Act, 1947 and amended from time to time
 People's Revolutionary Party of Kangleipak
 People's Liberation Army
 Popular Front of India
 Students Islamic Movement of India
 Tamil Nadu Liberation Army
 Tamil National Retrieval Troops
 Tehreek-ul-Mujahideen and all its manifestations
 United Liberation Front of Assam
 United National Liberation Front

See also
 List of banned terrorists
 United States Department of State list of Foreign Terrorist Organizations
 State Sponsors of Terrorism (U.S. list) 
 List of charities accused of ties to terrorism
 List of designated terrorist groups

 Related topics
 Afghan training camp
 Ghazwa-e-Hind
 Inter-Services Intelligence activities in India
 List of terrorist attacks in India
 Pakistan and state-sponsored terrorism
 Terrorism in India

References

External links
 Official list

 
Lists of organisations based in India
Islamic terrorism in India